Gaurakisora Dasa Babaji (1838–1915) is a well-known acharya from the Gaudiya Vaishnava tradition of Hinduism, and is regarded as a Mahatma or saint by followers of his lineage. During his lifetime Gaurakisora Dasa Babaji became famous for his teachings on the process of Bhakti Yoga and for his unorthodox avadhuta like behaviour as a sadhu, or babaji in Vrindavan.

He was born on 17 November 1838 in a simple mercantile family in the village of Vagyana, near to Tepakhola in the district of Faridpur, part of modern-day Bangladesh. After the death of his wife when he was 29 years old, he accepted the life of a Babaji in the Gaudiya Vaishnava tradition under the tutelage of Jagannatha Dasa Babaji, after meeting the latter's disciple, Bhagavat Dasa Babaji. He became a mendicant, staying in the holy cities of Vrindavan and Navadwip, deeply absorbed in singing and chanting the sacred names of Radha and Krishna (Bhajan).
he died on his 77th birthday in 1915
In the early 1900s, Bhaktisiddhanta Sarasvati Thakura acknowledged that he took initiation (in a night dream) from Gaurakisora Dasa Babaji and given the name 'Varsabhanavi devi daitya dasa'. Bhaktisiddhanta Sarasvata would later take an unorthodox form of initiation into the sannyasa order, in which "he simply sat down before a picture of Gaura Kisora dasa Babaji and invested that order upon himself." This is considered by some a contested topic.

See also

Chaitanya Mahaprabhu
Nityananda
Six Goswamis of Vrindavan

References

Further reading

External links
 Gaura Kishora das Babaji Maharaj: Biography on salagram.net
 Gaurakisora das Babaji: Biography by gosai.com
 Srila Gaurakisora Dasa Babaji Maharaja: Biography on purebhakti.com

 

1838 births
1915 deaths
People from Faridpur District
Gaudiya religious leaders
Vaishnava saints
Bengali Hindu saints
19th-century Bengalis
People from Nadia district